Sir Smith Child, 1st Baronet (5 March 1808 – 27 March 1896) was a Conservative Party politician in the United Kingdom.

He was born at Newfield Hall, Tunstall, Staffordshire the son of John George Child and the grandson of Admiral Smith Child (1730–1813). In 1835 he married Sarah, daughter and heiress of Richard Clarke Hill of Stallington Hall, Stone, Staffordshire. They had issue, beside one daughter, two sons:

Smith Hill Child, born 25 August 1837, died 20 January 1867.  He married Isabella Eleanor, daughter of Major Colin Campbell, of Jura, but left only one daughter.
John George Child, born 25 August 1847, died in 1895.  He married in 1877 Helen, daughter of the Reverend George Mather, of Huntley Hall, Staffordshire, and had issue two daughters, and two sons:

Smith Hill Child, who succeeded his own grandfather as 2nd Baronet.
Roylance George Child, born 7 January 1882, died unmarried 12 September 1901.

He was member of parliament (MP) for Staffordshire North from 1851 to 1859, and for Staffordshire West from 1868 to 1874. He was appointed High Sheriff of Staffordshire for 1865.

He was made a baronet on 7 December 1868, of Newfield and of Stallington in the county of Staffordshire, and of Dunlosset, Islay, the county of Argyll.

Tunstall clock tower was erected in his honour in 1893. Following his death in 1896, aged eighty-eight, his title passed to his eldest grandson Smith Hill Child.

References

External links 
 

1808 births
1896 deaths
People from Tunstall, Staffordshire
Conservative Party (UK) MPs for English constituencies
Baronets in the Baronetage of the United Kingdom
UK MPs 1847–1852
UK MPs 1852–1857
UK MPs 1857–1859
UK MPs 1868–1874
High Sheriffs of Staffordshire